Dominic John DeCicco (born September 11, 1988) is an American football scout and former linebacker. He works as an area scout for the San Francisco 49ers of the National Football League (NFL).

He was signed by the Chicago Bears as an undrafted free agent in 2011, and would also play for the Tampa Bay Buccaneers and Minnesota Vikings. He played college football at Pittsburgh.

Early life
DeCicco went to Thomas Jefferson High School, where he played wide receiver, quarterback, safety, cornerback, and kick/punt returner.  He was called one of the most diverse athletes in the state his senior year throwing for over 1,000 yards, rushing for over 1,000 yards, and also returning a kick and punt for a touchdown. He would go on to win one PIAA and two Western Pennsylvania Interscholastic Athletic League championships.  DeCicco was also a four-year letterman in basketball and 1,000-point scorer.

College career
DeCicco played for the Panthers as a strong safety. As a true freshman in 2007, DeCicco played in 10 games primarily on special teams, and garnered six tackles. In 2008, he played in all 13 games, while starting 11 at safety, recording 56 tackles and a team high four interceptions. In 2009, he was named to the second-team All-Big East team after having 88 tackles, three interceptions, and a forced fumble. He also was named Big East Defensive Player of the Week for week 8 against the USF Bulls, where he recorded 10 tackles. DeCicco ranked seventh among Big East defenders with 7.8 tackles per game.

Professional career

Chicago Bears
DeCicco went undrafted in the 2011 NFL Draft, and was signed by the Bears. He played in all 16 games, and recorded 12 special teams tackles, which ranks second on the team. In 2012, DeCicco filled in for Brian Urlacher at middle linebacker during OTAs while he was out with a knee injury. On August 29, DeCicco was released by Chicago. On December 4, DeCicco was brought back by the Bears on a two-year contract. On May 13, 2013, DeCicco was released.

Tampa Bay Buccaneers
On July 31, 2013, DeCicco was signed by the Tampa Bay Buccaneers.

Minnesota Vikings
DeCicco signed with the Minnesota Vikings in May 2014. He was waived/injured by the Vikings on August 18, 2014. He was placed on the team's injured reserve list on August 19, 2014.

Post-playing career
In 2016, DeCicco was a scouting intern with the San Francisco 49ers before joining the organization as a scouting department assistant the following year.

References

External links
Chicago Bears bio
Pittsburgh Panthers bio

1988 births
Living people
People from Jefferson Hills, Pennsylvania
Sportspeople from the Pittsburgh metropolitan area
Players of American football from Pennsylvania
American football linebackers
American football safeties
Pittsburgh Panthers football players
American people of Italian descent
Chicago Bears players
Tampa Bay Buccaneers players
Minnesota Vikings players
San Francisco 49ers scouts